Staddon is a surname. Notable people with the surname include:

Bradley Staddon (born 1984), Zimbabwean cricketer
Ernest Staddon (1882–1965), English cricketer
J. E. R. Staddon, British-born American psychologist
Jessica Staddon, American computer scientist
Robert Staddon (disambiguation), multiple people